Gerry Mulligan '63 (subtitled The Concert Jazz Band) is an album recorded by American jazz saxophonist and bandleader Gerry Mulligan featuring performances recorded in late 1962 which were released on the Verve label.

Reception

The Allmusic review states "this is a high-quality if rather brief program. Trumpeter Clark Terry and guitarist Jim Hall co-star with Mulligan in the solo department. It is a pity that this orchestra could not prosper; all five of its recordings are worth getting".

Track listing
 "Little Rock Getaway" (Carl Sigman, Joe Sullivan) - 3:01
 "Ballad" (Gerry Mulligan) - 4:11
 "Big City Life" (Bob Brookmeyer) - 5:19
 "Big City Blues" (Brookmeyer) - 5:39
 "My Kinda Love" (Louis Alter, Jo Trent) - 3:55
 "Pretty Little Gypsy" (Gary McFarland) - 3:35
 "Bridgehampton South" (McFarland) - 5:09
 "Bridgehampton Strut" (McFarland) - 3:55

Personnel
Gerry Mulligan - baritone saxophone, clarinet, track 4 and 6 arranger
Don Ferrara, Doc Severinsen, Nick Travis - trumpet
Clark Terry - trumpet, flugelhorn
Willie Dennis - trombone
Tony Studd - bass trombone
Bob Brookmeyer - valve trombone, piano, tracks 3 and 4 arranger
Eddie Caine - alto saxophone, alto flute
Gene Quill - alto saxophone, clarinet
Jim Reider - tenor saxophone
Gene Allen - baritone saxophone, bass clarinet
Jim Hall - guitar
Bill Crow - bass
Gus Johnson - drums
Gary McFarland - arranger

References

Gerry Mulligan albums
1963 albums
Verve Records albums
Albums arranged by Gary McFarland